Operation Tariq al-Qods (meaning "Path to Qods") was a military operation launched by Iran during the Iran–Iraq War to free Bostan in the Khuzestan province. It was fought from 29 November to 7 December 1981 and was carried out jointly by the Iranian army and the Islamic Revolutionary Guard Corps.

The operation resulted in the liberation of Bostan and 70 villages. The news of Bostan's liberation was the first such news released during the war. It was labeled by Ayatollah Khomeini, Iran's leader at the time, as "the victory of victories".

Before the battle 
Iran initially tried to regain control over Bostan in August 1981 but was not successful.

Operation planning 
The operation was designed by two independent groups affiliated with IRGC and the Iranian army, respectively under the supervision of Mohsen Rezaei and Ali Sayyad Shirazi. The planning groups selected Dashte-e Azadegan zone for the operation, where Iranian troops would require less forces and equipment for victory. Moreover, the area included the Chazabeh border terminal, whose capture could divide the Iraqi forces located in the north and south of Khuzestan province. More reconnaissance was then carried out before the operation.

Reconnaissance 
The reconnaissance operations were carried out under the observation of Hassan Baqeri. According to one of the reconnaissance forces, the Iraqi troops in the operation zone were watched on an hourly basis. After reviewing the reports issued by the operation intelligence unit, Baqeri advised the attack be conducted via Chazabeh, which was a sandy and impassable route. The suggestion was rejected initially by army commanders, but was later accepted. To increase the possibility of victory, Jihad of Construction constructed a 9 km road, allowing a substantial number of the Iranian troops on the northern flank of the Iraqi defenses.

The battle
The operation was launched on 29 November 1981 and lasted more than a week. Sixty tanks and 20,000 soldiers were dispatched towards Bostan for the operation. The Iranians used human wave attacks in their offensive for the first time in the war. Around 13,000 Iranian troops fought in the operation, more than half of which were IRGC forces. During the operation, Iran lost 6,000 troops, more than twice as many men as the Iraqis (2,500). However, the attrition rate was in Iran's favor, as it was able to eliminate an important supply route. This was critical because Iraq did not have enough soldiers for a long front line. After almost 36 hours, the Iranian troops retook Bostan and repelled the Iraqi forces away towards the west by several kilometers.

Iranian attack
On the evening of 28 November, as it beame dark, intelligence forces used lanterns to mark the newly constructed road through Chazabeh strait. Five minutes after midnight on 29 November, the commanders announced "Ya Hossein" ("O Hossein !"), signaling the start of the operation. The attack was carried out via two columns, one on the north axis and one on the south. In the north, the Iranian troops reached Iraq's artillery unit before they woke up, and after an intense fight the Iranian side won the battle. In the south, Iraqi troops were higher in numbers, making the fight more difficult for the Iranians. Hence, some of the north forces were dispatched to south. Bostan was liberated on the morning of 29 November and the news was sent to Tehran, marking the first news about the liberation of a city during the Iran-Iraq war. Iraqi forces had not expected an attack due to the poor conditions.

Iraqi counterattack
Iraqi forces conducted a counterattack in the south. After three days of fighting, the counterattack was defeated by the Iranians. On 6 November, Iranian forces were surprised by Iraqi commandos trying to cross the Saboleh bridge. Seven Iraqi tanks passed over the bridge, threatening Bostan. The two sides exchanged fire and the Iraqi tanks were captured by Iran, leading to an Iraqi retreat.

Order of battle

Iran 
The following was the order of battle by the Iranian troops:
Ground Forces of Islamic Republic of Iran Army:
16th Armored Division of Qazvin
1st Brigade
2nd Brigade
92nd Armored Division of Ahvaz
3rd Brigade
77th Infantry Division of Khorasan
1st Brigade
8 artillery battalions
Pasdaran:Commanded by Gholam Ali Rashid
1st Ashura Brigade
9 infantry battalions
2nd Karbala BrigadeCommanded by Morteza Ghorbani
3 infantry battalions
3rd Imam Hossein BrigadeCommanded by Hosein Kharrazi
8 infantry battalions
34th Imam Sajjad Brigade
Imam Hassan Brigade (backup)
3 infantry battalions
Islamic Republic of Iran Gendarmerie
1 battalion
Islamic Republic of Iran Air Force
Islamic Republic of Iran Army Aviation

Iraq
The Iraqi order of battle at the onset of the operation was as follows:

321st Artillery Battalion
330th Artillery Battalion
355th Artillery Battalion
368th Artillery Battalion
382nd Artillery Battalion
390th Artillery Battalion
1 artillery battery
362nd Artillery Battalion
2 artillery batteries
Iraqi Air Force
Iraqi Air Defense Command

North of Karkheh:
5th Division
26th Armored Brigade
8th Mountain Infantry Division
23rd Brigade
1st Infantry Battalion
4th Mountain Infantry Division
93rd Infantry Brigade
422nd Infantry Brigade
31st Special Forces Brigade
32nd Special Forces Brigade
Popular Army
Al-Mahmoudiyah and Islam units

South of Karkheh:
6th Armored Division
25th Mechanized Brigade
16th Armored Brigade
30th Armored Brigade
96th Armored Brigade
11th Infantry Division
48th Infantry Brigade
3rd Armored Division
12th Armored Brigade
Qadisiyyah Tank Battalion
Qutaibah Tank Battalion
Mu'tasim Tank Battalion
3rd Mechanized Battalion
32nd Special Forces Brigade
1 battalion
20th Difaa al-Wajibat Battalion
7th Infantry Division
Commando units
Popular Army
Islam unit

See also 
 Operation Quds-1

References

Tariq al-Qods
History of Khuzestan Province